Frisman Jackson (born June 12, 1979) is an American football coach and former player who is the wide receivers coach for the Pittsburgh Steelers of the National Football League (NFL). He previously served as a wide receivers coach at Baylor, Temple, NC State, Northern Illinois, Akron, and Western Illinois. Jackson also previously served as a wide receivers coach for the Tennessee Titans. He played college football at Western Illinois and signed as an undrafted free agent with Cleveland Browns in 2002.

Early life
Jackson, a South Side Chicago native, played high school football at Morgan Park High School on Chicago, where he played football, basketball, baseball, and ran track.  He was an All-City and All-State quarterback in 1997. Jackson is considered by many to be one of the best quarterbacks in the history of the Chicago Public League.

Playing career

College
Jackson is considered to be one of the best wide receivers to play at Western Illinois University. He holds single-game school records for both receptions (14) and yards (286.) During his college career he was also the team's starting quarterback through his junior year, where he holds the school's single-game rushing record among quarterbacks, with 109 yards.  As a senior wide receiver, he caught 55 balls for 1,047 yards.  Prior to playing at Western, Jackson was enrolled at Northern Illinois University as a quarterback. In 1997, Jackson became the first true freshman to start a football game at NIU since 1979 when he started against Kansas State, and he would go on to start 7 more games that year.

National Football League

Cleveland Browns
In 2002, he was signed by the Cleveland Browns as an undrafted free agent out of Western Illinois University.  Jackson played in five NFL seasons from 2002–2006 for the Cleveland Browns. Had 40 career catches for 490 yards and 1 touchdown.

New York Jets
In January 2007 he signed as a free agent with the New York Jets, but was released shortly before the season began.

Coaching career

Western Illinois
In 2008, Jackson began his coaching career as a wide receivers coach at Western Illinois University.

Akron
In 2010, Jackson was hired as a wide receivers coach at the University of Akron.

Northern Illinois
In 2012, Jackson was hired as a wide receivers coach at Northern Illinois University.

NC State
In 2013, Jackson was hired as a wide receivers coach at North Carolina State University.

Temple
In 2015, Jackson was hired as a wide receivers coach at Temple University.

Tennessee Titans
In January 2017, Jackson was hired by the Tennessee Titans as their wide receivers coach under head coach Mike Mularkey.

Baylor
In 2018, Jackson was hired as a wide receivers coach at Baylor University.

Carolina Panthers
On January 16, 2020, Jackson was hired by the Carolina Panthers as their wide receivers coach, reuniting with head coach Matt Rhule.

Pittsburgh Steelers
On February 8 the Pittsburgh Steelers hired Jackson as their Wide Receivers coach

Personal life
Jackson earned undergraduate and master's degrees from Western Illinois University. He and his wife Lindsey, also a Western Illinois University grad, have two kids.

References

1979 births
Living people
Sportspeople from Chicago
American football wide receivers
American football quarterbacks
Northern Illinois Huskies football players
Western Illinois Leathernecks football players
Cleveland Browns players
New York Jets players
Baylor Bears football coaches
Tennessee Titans coaches
Temple Owls football coaches
Akron Zips football coaches
Players of American football from Chicago
NC State Wolfpack football coaches
Carolina Panthers coaches
Pittsburgh Steelers coaches